István Esterházy may refer to:

István Esterházy (1572–1596), son of Ferenc Esterházy
István Esterházy (1616–1641), son of Nikolaus, Count Esterházy